Mohanbhai Laljibhai Patel was an Indian politician. He was elected to the Lok Sabha, the lower house of the Parliament of India from Junagadh, Gujarat. He was founder of Patel Kelvani Mandal in Junagadh. He belong to Koli caste of Gujarat.

References

External links
Official biographical sketch in Parliament of India website

Indian National Congress politicians
1933 births
Lok Sabha members from Gujarat
India MPs 1980–1984
India MPs 1984–1989
Koli people